The Ambassador of Malaysia to Hungary is the head of Malaysia's diplomatic mission to Hungary. The position has the rank and status of an Ambassador Extraordinary and Plenipotentiary and is based in the Embassy of Malaysia, Budapest.

List of heads of mission

Ambassadors to Hungary

See also
 Hungary–Malaysia relations

References 

 
Hungary
Malaysia